Sultan-Murza or Saltan-Murza was an Ingush prince of a village located in Darial Gorge — Lars. In 1589, as part of the Georgian embassy, Sultan-Murza, swore allegiance to the Moscow Tsar.

Biography

Connections with Shikh-Murza 
Because of the words of Sultan-Murza that Shikh-Murza Okotsky was his "brother", some researchers made the erroneous conclusion that Sultan-Murza's father is Ushar-Murza (Shikh-Murza's father) and, therefore, that they both "Okuki". However, calling another feudal owner equal in status a brother was a common practice of that era; even warring kings called each other brothers. That is why Sultan-Murza speaks of brotherhood in order to emphasize that his own status is higher than that of the Uzdens, that is, that he is not an Uzden, but the same feudal owner as Shikh-Murza.

Researcher E. N. Kusheva drew attention to the fact that Saltan-Murza called Shikh-Murza Okotsky "brother", but she did not come to literal conclusions, and therefore writes: “Let me remind you that in the article list of Prince S. Zvenigorodsky Saltan-Murza calls Shikh-Murza Okotsky his brother. The Vyappian origin of Saltan-Murza and the population of Lars of that period has been proven in historical science and does not need an argument in the form of a conditional assumption about his “blood relations” with Shikh-Murza. Taking into account this circumstance, E.N. Kushev, leads this turn of speech precisely as a feudal "brotherhood".

Notes

References

Bibliography 
 
 
 
 
 

Ingush people